Another Life is the debut studio album by American singer-songwriter and The Killers bassist Mark Stoermer, which was released on November 1, 2011 as a free download via markstoermer.com, and on CD and vinyl on January 24, 2012. It was also released on iTunes the same day along with two bonus tracks. The album was self-released on St. August Records.

Stoermer recorded the album in early 2011 with the help of Glenn Moule and Joel Stein from Howling Bells and Jason Hill from Louis XIV. The album was mixed by Robert Root and mastered by Bob Ludwig.

Writing and recording
Originally Stoermer had no intentions of releasing the collection of songs to the public. The album was written and recorded over the span of two years, beginning with writing in hotel rooms and recording demos on a laptop.
"As I was writing, I wasn't really sure where it was going. At first, I didn't even know I was making a record. I was just making demos and playing with ideas. . I worked on the songs off and on for about a year and a half. Some of the songs started to develop at the end of 2009, but some weren't written until the beginning of last year. At the end of the last Killers tour, I was writing in hotel rooms with a laptop and GarageBand. I'd hum little melodies and lyrical ideas into a Dictaphone. I spent a good deal of our break figuring out how to write and record these songs."

Track listing
All songs written and composed by Mark Stoermer

Digital bonus tracks

Personnel
Weary Soul

Mark Stoermer – Vocals, Acoustic Guitar, Bass, Keyboard, Percussion, Harmonica

Jason Hill – Electric Guitar, Piano, Synthesizer, Percussion

Glenn Moule – Drums Percussion

Shadow in a Dream

Mark Stoermer – Vocals, Acoustic Guitar, Percussion

Glen Moule – Tambourine

Everyone Loves The Girl

Mark Stoermer – Vocals, Acoustic Guitar, Bass, Keyboard

Joel Stein – Acoustic Guitar, Lap Steel Guitar

Glen Moule – Drums Percussion

Need a Hand

Mark Stoermer – Vocals, Acoustic Guitar, Electric Guitar, Bass, Wurlitzer Piano

Glenn Moule – Drums, Percussion

Amber Bough

Mark Stoermer – Vocals, Acoustic Guitar, Bass

Jason Hill – Synthesizer

Alex Carepetis – Drums

The Way We Were Before

Mark Stoermer – Vocals, Acoustic Guitar, Keyboard, Electronic Drum Programming

Glen Moule – Drums, Percussion, Vocals

Joel Stein – Lap Steel Guitar, Piano

The Haunts

Mark Stoermer – Vocals, Acoustic Guitar, Electric Guitar, Bass, Keyboard

Joel Stein – Lap Steel Guitar, Piano

Glenn Moule – Drums, Percussion

No Time

Mark Stoermer – Vocals, Acoustic Guitar, Bass, Keyboard

Joel Stein – Acoustic Guitar, Piano, Vocals

Glen Moule – Drums, Percussion

There Is No Is

Mark Stoermer – Vocals, Acoustic Guitar, Keyboard, Percussion, Electronic Drum Programming, Piano

Glen Moule – Percussion

Bird sound sample courtesy of Rhett Boswell, Wildlife Biologist

Another Life

Mark Stoermer – Vocals, Acoustic Guitar, Bass

Joel Stein – Electric Guitar, Piano, Lap Steel Guitar

Glenn Moule – Drums, Percussion

Weary Soul String and Horn transcription by Nadia Nasedkin

––––––

All Songs by Mark Stoermer

Universal-Polygram Int. Publ., Inc. (ASCAP)

Produced By Mark Stoermer, Joel Stein and Glenn Moule except Weary Soul and Amber Bough produced by Jason Hill and Mark Stoermer

Engineered by Robert Root

Additional Engineering by Jason Hill, Joel Stein and Mark Stoermer

Mixed by Robert Root

Mastered by Bob Ludwig

Recorded at Battle Born, Ulysses and home studios in LV and SF

Front and Back photos by Heather Hyte

Inside Photo by Wyatt Boswell

References

2011 debut albums
Mark Stoermer albums